Re-Focus is a 1972 compilation album of songs by the Monkees, released on Bell Records, the successor to Colgems Records, the Monkees' original record label.

The band had quit, one by one, over 1969 and 1970, but their television series continued to air on CBS-TV on Saturday mornings (moving to ABC in 1972). Re-Focus replaces Colgems' previous three "best-of" collections, namely Greatest Hits, Golden Hits and Barrel Full of Monkees.

Re-Focus was repackaged and reissued a number of times in various territories. Each release featured the same track listing but with different packaging and artwork, usually under the title The Best of the Monkees or simply The Monkees (not to be confused with their debut album of the same name). In 1973, Polydor in the Netherlands issued the album as Superstarshine Vol. 29, and in 1979, Arista in Japan issued the album as The Best, with three additional tracks: "Star Collector," "Valleri" and "Words."

In 1976, following Bell Records' evolution into Arista Records, the track listing of Re-Focus was repackaged yet again for the US, yielding the successful compilation The Monkees Greatest Hits.

Track listing

Side 1

Side 2

References

The Monkees compilation albums
1972 greatest hits albums